Alam Khan may refer to:

 Alam Khan (composer) (1943–2022), Bangladeshi composer and music director
 Alam Khan (actor) (born 1999), Indian actor, model and dancer
 Alam Khan (politician), Bangladeshi politician